Zenenata is a genus of moths belonging to the subfamily Tortricinae of the family Tortricidae. It consists of only one species, Zenenata zenena, which is found in Loja Province, Ecuador.

The wingspan is about 16.5 mm. The ground colour of the forewings is brownish cream, sprinkled with cinnamon brown. The hindwings are white, tinged with cream near the apex and with traces of grey spots terminally.

Etymology
The generic name refers to the type locality of the type-species. The specific name refers to Zenen Alto, the type locality.

See also
List of Tortricidae genera

References

Euliini
Monotypic moth genera
Taxa named by Józef Razowski
Moths of South America